"Deadbeat Club" is a song written and performed by American new wave band the B-52's. The song was released as the fifth and final single from their fifth studio album, Cosmic Thing (1989).

Background
The song is about the band's early days in Athens when they would hang around in cafes drinking coffee. Because they didn't work or do anything, their parents nicknamed them "Deadbeats". Allen's, mentioned in the nostalgic song, was a real-life place in Athens, Georgia. Normaltown is a neighborhood of Athens.  The music video features R.E.M. frontman Michael Stipe.

Charts
"Deadbeat Club" peaked at  30 on the US Billboard Hot 100, No. 21 on the New Zealand Singles Chart, No. 35 on the Canadian RPM Top Singles chart, and No. 73 on the Australian Singles Chart in 1990.

References

The B-52's songs
1989 songs
1990 singles
Song recordings produced by Don Was
Song recordings produced by Nile Rodgers
Songs written by Cindy Wilson
Songs written by Fred Schneider
Songs written by Kate Pierson
Songs written by Keith Strickland